The Dick's Sporting Goods Open is a PGA Tour Champions event in Endicott, New York. It debuted in July 2007, supplanting the B.C. Open, a former PGA Tour event from 1971 through 2006. It is sponsored by Dick's Sporting Goods, founded in adjacent Binghamton.

The tournament is played at the En-Joie Golf Club in Endicott in Upstate New York. En-Joie Golf Club opened  in 1927 under the original design of Ernie Smith. The golf course was originally built by George F. Johnson, the owner of the Endicott-Johnson Shoe Company. Johnson created the golf course as a place of recreation for his employees who worked at the local shoe factory in Endicott. In 1998 and 1999, the golf course layout was renovated by Michael Hurdzan. He changed the original relatively flat, round greens into very large, undulating greens that challenge all level of golfers. With narrow, tree-lined fairways coupled with large, elevated greens En-Joie golf course is a true test for golfers of all skill levels.

The event is operated by Broome County Community Charities. The purse in 2016 was $2 million, with a winner's share of $300,000.

Winners

Concert on the Green
A feature of the tournament is a concert presented adjacent to the 18th green after the conclusion of Friday play.

References

External links
Coverage on the PGA Tour's official site
En-Joie Golf Club

PGA Tour Champions events
Golf in New York (state)
Sports in Binghamton, New York
Recurring sporting events established in 2007
2007 establishments in New York (state)